Fire Island National Seashore (FINS) is a United States National Seashore that protects a  section of Fire Island, an approximately  long and  wide barrier island separated from Long Island by the Great South Bay. The island is part of New York State's Suffolk County and the Outer Barrier.

There are 17 private communities within the boundaries of Fire Island National Seashore including Saltaire, Fire Island Pines, and Ocean Beach. Only two bridges lead to Fire Island and the national seashore and there are no public roads within the seashore itself. The Robert Moses Causeway leads to Robert Moses State Park on the western end of Fire Island while the William Floyd Parkway leads to the eastern end of the island.  The seashore can also be accessed by private boat or by ferry from the communities of Patchogue, Sayville, and Bay Shore on Long Island.

Fire Island National Seashore was established as a unit of the National Park Service on September 11, 1964.

A separate unit of Fire Island National Seashore located on Long Island protects the home and estate of William Floyd, an American Revolutionary War general and a signer of the Declaration of Independence. The William Floyd House is listed on the National Register of Historic Places and is located in Mastic Beach, New York.

Attractions

 The Fire Island Light is located near the western end of the seashore near Robert Moses State Park.
 Lighthouse Beach is a beach at the extreme west end of the seashore, just east of Robert Moses State Park. Since 2013, a nudity ban has been enforced at this former clothing optional beach.
 Sailor's Haven is home to a popular  boardwalk trail through an area known as the Sunken Forest as well as a visitor center, general store, and a public marina.
 Otis Pike Fire Island High Dune Wilderness, located on the eastern end of Fire Island, is the only federally designated U.S. Wilderness Area in New York State.

Wilderness area 

The Otis Pike Fire Island High Dune Wilderness, also known as Fire Island Wilderness, is a  wilderness area on Fire Island. The United States Congress designated the Otis Pike High Dune Wilderness Area in 1980. The wilderness area is named for former New York Congressman Otis G. Pike, who co-sponsored the bill which created the Fire Island National Seashore and worked hard to secure public support and the legislation's passage through Congress to establish the new national park. It is the only federally designated wilderness area in New York State and one of the smallest wilderness areas managed by the National Park Service. 

The wilderness includes pine forests, grassy wetlands, and dunes that serve as habitat for white-tailed deer, herons and migratory waterfowl. The wilderness area does not technically include the beaches that face the Atlantic Ocean. Hiking, back-country camping, and fishing access are available within the wilderness.

Access to the Otis G. Pike Wilderness can be obtained either from Watch Hill (which is accessible seasonally by ferry or private boat) or Smith Point County Park, accessible year round by car or bus. The Wilderness Visitor Center is located on the eastern edge of the wilderness, adjacent to Smith Point County Park. Privately owned Bellport Beach is located near the central area of the wilderness.

Old Inlet breach 

Old Inlet, just west of Smith Point County Park in the wilderness, has been the site of breaches of Fire Island causing the Atlantic Ocean to join with the Great South Bay.

The most recent breach occurred during the high tides associated with Hurricane Sandy in October 2012.

National Park Service officials have been debating whether to take action to close the breach. Contingency plans put in place to manage breaches within the wilderness area called for initial monitoring of the breach; as of 2014, the breach has stabilized and monitoring continues. Although some residents have called for closure of the breach, due to perceived increases in flooding after the breach's opening, the breach has been responsible for increased water quality in Great South Bay, which had been becoming increasingly polluted by suburban runoff prior to the breach's formation.

Officials moved to close two breaches which formed on either side of Moriches Inlet following Hurricane Sandy — one in Cupsogue Beach County Park and the other in Smith Point County Park. As of 2015, a final decision on whether to close the Old Inlet breach has not been made, although a draft plan for action was scheduled to be released in summer 2016.

Gallery

See also

 Great South Bay
 Smith Point County Park
 Watch Hill, New York

References

External links

 National Park Service: Fire Island National Seashore

Fire Island, New York
National Seashores of the United States
Protected areas established in 1964
National Park Service areas in New York (state)
Protected areas of Suffolk County, New York
Islands of Suffolk County, New York
Islands of New York (state)